Wendell Loy Nielsen (born c. 1941) was the president of the Fundamentalist Church of Jesus Christ of Latter-Day Saints (the FLDS Church), replacing Warren Jeffs, at that time imprisoned on charges related to sexual assaults against minors.

Church leadership 
Nielsen served as first counselor to Warren Jeff; as well as Warren't father, Rulon Jeffs.

In September 2007, Warren Jeff, the president of the FLDS Church was convicted on two first-degree felony charges of accomplice rape and received two five-to-life prison sentences. Shortly after, Jeff resigned as church's president. Later the church filed the paperwork with the Utah Department of Commerce to certify that Nielsen following the resignation of Jeffs, was named the President of the Fundamentalist Church of Jesus Christ of Latter-Day Saints.

While both Rulon and Warren Jeffs were FLDS presidents and regarded as prophets, Nielsen's role as the president was reportedly limited to managing church's corporate entity. "The state paperwork is a legal formality that clarifies that Nielsen has the authority to make decisions related to church business and legal dealings, church attorney Rodney Parker said."

In July 2010, Warren Jeffs' rape as an accomplice conviction was overturned due to a flaw in jury instructions, and a new trial was ordered, but in August 2011, Warren Jeff's was found guilty of another charge: sexual assault of a minor, for raping a 12-year-old and a 15-year-old; for which he was sentenced to life in prison, plus twenty years.

Form the prison, Jeffs reportedly removed Nielsen as the church president and retook the control of the FLDS Church in January 2011.

Nielsen was convicted and imprisoned in 2012; and his status in the FLDS Church since is unclear.

Arrest, trial and conviction 
During the April 2008 raid on the YFZ ranch, Texas law enforcement seized FLDS Church records, including church's marriage registry.

Based on this records, in November 2008, Texas authorities indicted Nielson with three counts of bigamy for purporting to marry persons other than his spouse while being legally married. According to the documents, Nielsen allegedly married 34 women in addition to his legal wife, and performed the ceremonies in which Warren Jeffs married girls as young as 12 year old

In March 2012, Nielsen was convicted on three counts of bigamy and sentenced to 10 years in prison, as well as ordered to pay a $10,000 fine for each count.

See also
 List of Mormon fundamentalist leaders
 Mormon fundamentalism

References

External links
John Hamer, New FLDS President Called, February 8, 2010
 Official FLDS website
 "FLDS 101"
 Polygamy from AttorneyGeneral.Utah.gov - includes information on Utah Attorney General's interaction with the United Effort Plan Trust

1941 births
Living people
American Latter Day Saint leaders
Fundamentalist Church of Jesus Christ of Latter-Day Saints members
Mormon fundamentalist leaders
Religious scandals
Date of birth missing (living people)
Place of birth missing (living people)
Religious leaders from Utah